The 1926 Oregon Webfoots football team represented the University of Oregon in the Pacific Coast Conference (PCC) during the 1926 college football season.  In their first season under head coach John McEwan, the Webfoots compiled a 2–4–1 record (1–4 against PCC opponents), finished in a tie for sixth place in the PCC, and were outscored by their opponents, 88 to 86. The team played its home games at Hayward Field in Eugene, Oregon.

Schedule

References

Oregon
Oregon Ducks football seasons
Oregon Webfoots football